Cryptocercus darwini is a species of cockroach in the family Cryptocercidae. It is found in North America.

References

Further reading

 
 

Cockroaches
Articles created by Qbugbot
Insects described in 1999